The 2018–19 Buffalo Sabres season was the 49th season for the National Hockey League franchise that was established on May 22, 1970.

After experiencing a ten-game winning streak in November that put them atop the NHL standings, the Sabres regressed sharply the rest of the season and were officially eliminated from playoff contention on March 23, 2019, after suffering a 7–4 loss to the Montreal Canadiens, joining the 2016–17 Philadelphia Flyers as the only teams in NHL history to win 10 consecutive games and be eliminated from playoff contention.

With the Carolina Hurricanes clinching a playoff berth in the 2019 Stanley Cup playoffs, the Sabres became the team with the longest active postseason appearance drought in the NHL at eight consecutive seasons, about 1.5 years after their football counterparts, the Buffalo Bills, ended what was the longest active postseason appearance drought in the NFL at 17 consecutive seasons. On April 7, 2019, the Sabres fired Phil Housley, who became the fifth head coach to be fired since the Pegulas bought the team from Tom Golisano in February 2011.

Standings

Schedule and results

Preseason
The preseason schedule was published on June 15, 2018.

Regular season
The regular season schedule was released on June 21, 2018.

Player statistics
As of April 6, 2019

Skaters

Goaltenders

†Denotes player spent time with another team before joining the Sabres. Stats reflect time with the Sabres only.
‡Denotes player was traded mid-season. Stats reflect time with the Sabres only.
Bold/italics denotes franchise record.

Transactions
The Sabres have been involved in the following transactions during the 2018–19 season.

Trades

Free agents

Waivers

Contract terminations

Retirement

Signings

Draft picks

Below are the Buffalo Sabres' selections at the 2018 NHL Entry Draft, which was held on June 22 and 23, 2018, at the American Airlines Center in Dallas, Texas.

Notes:
 The Minnesota Wild's fourth-round pick went to the Buffalo Sabres as the result of a trade on June 30, 2017 that sent Tyler Ennis, Marcus Foligno and a third-round pick to Minnesota in exchange for Jason Pominville, Marco Scandella and this pick.

References

Buffalo Sabres seasons
Buffalo Sabres
Buffalo
Buffalo